= Haragapur =

- Village
- Location in Karnataka, India Haragapur (India)
- Coordinates: 16.24761°N 74.48741°E
- Country: India
- State: Karnataka
- District: Belagavi
- Talukas: Hukkeri

Population (2001)
  - Total: 2,000

Languages
  - Official: Kannada
- Time zone: UTC+5:30 (IST)
- PIN: 591313
- Nearest city: Sankeshwar
- Lok Sabha constituency: Chikodi
- Vidhan Sabha constituency: Hukkeri

Haragapur is a village in Belagavi district in the southern state of Karnataka, India. It is attached to NH-4. Places to visit are Shivaji Fort, Mallikarjun Temple & Navanath Mandir. Village is located on Hilltop. Language spoken here is Kannada Marathi
